In Greek mythology, Capaneus (Ancient Greek: Καπανεύς Kapaneús) was a son of Hipponous and either Astynome (daughter of Talaus) or Laodice (daughter of Iphis), and husband of Evadne, with whom he fathered Sthenelus. Some call his wife Ianeira.

Mythology
According to the legend, Capaneus had immense strength and body size and was an outstanding warrior. He was also notorious for his arrogance. He stood just at the wall of Thebes during the war of the Seven against Thebes and shouted that Zeus himself could not stop him from invading it. Vegetius refers to him as the first to use ladders in a siege. In Aeschylus, he bears a shield with a man without armour withstanding fire, a torch in hand, which reads 'I will burn the city,' in token of this. While he was mounting the ladder, Zeus struck and killed Capaneus with a thunderbolt, and Evadne threw herself on her husband's funeral pyre and died. His story was told by Aeschylus in his play Seven Against Thebes, by Euripides in his plays The Suppliants and The Phoenician Women, and by the Roman poet Statius.

Popular culture
 In the fourteenth canto of his Inferno, Dante sees Capaneus in the seventh circle (third round) of Hell. Along with the other blasphemers, or those "violent against God", Capaneus is condemned to lie supine on a plain of burning sand while fire rains down on him. He continues to curse the deity (whom, being a pagan, he addresses as "Jove" [Jupiter]) despite the ever harsher pains he thus inflicts upon himself, so that God "thereby should not have glad vengeance."
 In Ezra Pound's poem Hugh Selwyn Mauberley, Capaneus is mentioned, with the implication that Mauberly (and by extension Pound himself) shared the ancient hero's daring and over-confidence.

See also
 List of Greek mythological figures

Notes

References 

 Aeschylus, translated in two volumes. 1. Seven Against Thebes by Herbert Weir Smyth, Ph. D. Cambridge, MA. Harvard University Press. 1926. Online version at the Perseus Digital Library. Greek text available from the same website.
 Apollodorus, The Library with an English Translation by Sir James George Frazer, F.B.A., F.R.S. in 2 Volumes, Cambridge, MA, Harvard University Press; London, William Heinemann Ltd. 1921. ISBN 0-674-99135-4. Online version at the Perseus Digital Library. Greek text available from the same website.
 Euripides, The Complete Greek Drama edited by Whitney J. Oates and Eugene O'Neill, Jr. in two volumes. 1. The Suppliants, translated by E. P. Coleridge. New York. Random House. 1938. Online version at the Perseus Digital Library.
 Euripides, Euripidis Fabulae. vol. 2. Gilbert Murray. Oxford. Clarendon Press, Oxford. 1913. Greek text available at the Perseus Digital Library.
 Euripides, The Complete Greek Drama, edited by Whitney J. Oates and Eugene O'Neill, Jr. in two volumes. 2. Phoenissae, translated by Robert Potter. New York. Random House. 1938. Online version at the Perseus Digital Library.
 Euripides, Euripidis Fabulae. vol. 3. Gilbert Murray. Oxford. Clarendon Press, Oxford. 1913. Greek text available at the Perseus Digital Library.
 Gaius Julius Hyginus, Fabulae from The Myths of Hyginus translated and edited by Mary Grant. University of Kansas Publications in Humanistic Studies. Online version at the Topos Text Project.
 Philostratus the Elder. Imagines, translated by Arthur Fairbanks (1864-1944). Loeb Classical Library Volume 256. London: William Heinemann, 1931. Online version at the Topos Text Project.
 Philostratus the Lemnian (Philostratus Major), Flavii Philostrati Opera. Vol 2. Carl Ludwig Kayser. in aedibus B. G. Teubneri. Lipsiae. 1871. Greek text available at the Perseus Digital Library.
 Publius Ovidius Naso, Metamorphoses translated by Brookes More (1859-1942). Boston, Cornhill Publishing Co. 1922. Online version at the Perseus Digital Library.
 Publius Ovidius Naso, Metamorphoses. Hugo Magnus. Gotha (Germany). Friedr. Andr. Perthes. 1892. Latin text available at the Perseus Digital Library.
 Publius Papinius Statius, The Thebaid translated by John Henry Mozley. Loeb Classical Library Volumes. Cambridge, MA, Harvard University Press; London, William Heinemann Ltd. 1928. Online version at the Topos Text Project.
 Publius Papinius Statius, The Thebaid. Vol I-II. John Henry Mozley. London: William Heinemann; New York: G.P. Putnam's Sons. 1928. Latin text available at the Perseus Digital Library.
 Sophocles, The Antigone of Sophocles edited with introduction and notes by Sir Richard Jebb. Cambridge. Cambridge University Press. 1893. Online version at the Perseus Digital Library.
 Sophocles, Sophocles. Vol 1: Oedipus the king. Oedipus at Colonus. Antigone. With an English translation by F. Storr. The Loeb classical library, 20. Francis Storr. London; New York. William Heinemann Ltd.; The Macmillan Company. 1912. Greek text available at the Perseus Digital Library.

External links
 Myth Index – Capaneus

Characters in Seven against Thebes

Deeds of Zeus